Brian Michael Jean  (born February 3, 1963) is a Canadian politician who has served as the minister of Jobs, Economy and Northern Development since 2022 and the member of the Legislative Assembly (MLA) for Fort McMurray-Lac La Biche since March 16, 2022. He was leader of the Opposition and the last leader of the Wildrose Party from 2015 to 2017 before its merger into the United Conservative Party (UCP). Jean was a member of Parliament (MP) with the Conservative Party from 2004 to 2014 before entering provincial politics.

Jean worked as a lawyer in Fort McMurray for 11 years before he was elected to Parliament, where he represented Athabasca from 2004 to 2006 and Fort McMurray—Athabasca from 2006 to 2014, when he resigned from the House of Commons. He returned to political life in February 2015 when he announced that he would seek the leadership of the Wildrose Party. He was elected party leader on March 28, 2015. In the 2015 provincial election, Jean was elected in the provincial riding of Fort McMurray-Conklin and became the leader of the Opposition as the Wildrose Party formed the Official Opposition to the governing Alberta New Democratic Party (NDP).  Jean ceased to lead the Wildrose Party merged with the Progressive Conservatives (PCs) to become the United Conservative Party in 2017 and ran to be leader of the new party, losing to Jason Kenney. He resigned his seat in the Alberta legislature on March 5, 2018.

Jean re-entered provincial politics after winning a by-election on March 16, 2022. Upon Premier Kenney's resignation announcement on May 18, 2022, Jean declared his candidacy in the United Conservative party leadership election, which took place on October 6, 2022. He finished third on the first ballot with 11 percent of the vote, ultimately losing to Danielle Smith after his elimination from the sixth and final ballot.

Background 

Jean was born in Kelowna, British Columbia, and moved to Fort McMurray, Alberta in 1967 when he was four years old.

Jean has a Bachelor of Science degree from Warner Pacific College in Portland, Oregon, and Master of Business Administration and Bachelor of Laws degrees from Bond University in Gold Coast, Queensland, Australia. He also attended the law school at the University of Calgary, where he received qualification to be admitted to the Law Society of Alberta. This allowed him to practice law for 11 years in Fort McMurray prior to his political career.

Jean has worked as a farmhand, a printer's assistant, a businessperson, a lawyer, and an inspirational speaker. In his community, Jean served as the chairman of the Children's Health Foundation in Northern Alberta, chair of the Alberta Summer Games, president of the Fort McMurray Downtown Business Association, and director of the Fort McMurray Chamber of Commerce.

Political career

Member of Parliament 
Jean was first elected to the House of Commons as a Conservative Party of Canada candidate in the riding of Athabasca in 2004, sitting in the Official Opposition to Paul Martin's Liberal government. He was re-elected in the renamed riding of Fort McMurray—Athabasca in 2006, when the Conservatives formed government under Stephen Harper. In February 2006, Jean was appointed as the parliamentary secretary to minister of transport, infrastructure and communities, Lawrence Cannon. Jean was re-elected again in 2008 and 2011. After the 2011 election, he declined reappointment as parliamentary secretary in order to focus on his constituency needs. In the House of Commons, Jean served on the Finance, Justice, and Industry Committees.

On January 10, 2014, Jean announced that he would be resigning his seat on January 17, 2014, to return to private life in Fort McMurray.

Leader of the Wildrose Party 
The Wildrose Party was in disarray in late 2014 after eleven MLAs, including leader Danielle Smith, crossed the floor to the ruling Progressive Conservative Association of Alberta. A leadership election was organized to choose a new leader and Jean was encouraged to run. Jean entered the race on February 25, 2015. He was elected party leader on March 28, 2015, with 55 per cent of the vote, defeating Cypress-Medicine Hat MLA Drew Barnes and former Strathcona County mayor Linda Osinchuk.

The 2015 Alberta election was held on May 5, 2015, less than two months after Jean became Wildrose leader. The party retained its standing as Official Opposition in the legislature, growing its caucus from 17 in 2012, and 5 at dissolution, to 21. For the first time in Alberta history, the NDP formed government, with Rachel Notley becoming the premier of Alberta. This marked the end of 43 years of government by the Progressive Conservatives.

On August 30, 2016, Jean was hosting a forum in Fort McMurray when a local advocate for seniors complained about the quality of housing and health care for seniors. Jean answered that he had "been beating this drum for 10, 11 years" and said “I will continue to beat it, I promise. But it's against the law to beat Rachel Notley.”

Jean then apologized for what he later called "an inappropriate attempt at humour" and insisted Notley cares about housing and health care for seniors. He also led the room to applaud Notley for approving the construction of a long-term care home for seniors built in downtown Fort McMurray, an issue that former premier Ed Stelmach and PC MLA Guy Boutilier had feuded over.

Merger with PCs into UCP 
Jean's former federal caucus colleague Jason Kenney became Progressive Conservative leader after winning that party's leadership election in early 2017. Kenney's platform called for uniting the Progressive Conservative and Wildrose parties to form a united right-of-centre alliance. On March 20, 2017, Jean met with Kenney to begin unity discussions.

On May 18, 2017, Jean and Kenney announced that their two parties had come to a merger agreement and on July 22, 2017, the merger was passed with 95 per cent support from both the PCs and the Wildrose. The merger agreement formed the United Conservative Party, a leadership election occurred on October 28, 2017, in which Jean was defeated by Kenney, and a founding convention to be held in 2018.

Jean announced his resignation from the legislature on March 5, 2018. He said in an interview that he knew people would accuse him of being a sore loser following his defeat to Kenney, but insisted he was resigning to rebuild his home that was destroyed in 2016 Fort McMurray wildfire and spend time with family, including a sister who was battling Stage 4 cancer at the time. He was succeeded by UCP MLA Laila Goodridge in the 2018 Fort McMurray-Conklin by-election.

Return to politics 
Jean became a vocal critic of Kenney's leadership through social media and guest columns in the Edmonton Journal. After criticizing Kenney's leadership during the COVID-19 pandemic, Jean called for his resignation on June 7, 2021.

On November 3, 2021, Jean announced that he would seek the UCP nomination for an upcoming by-election in Fort McMurray-Lac La Biche, and won this nomination contest on December 12 against Joshua Gogo, with 68 per cent of the vote.

During the nomination race, a post to Jean's LinkedIn profile said Kenney and his supporters were “pushing a Nigerian economist who lives in Fort McMurray” to be the UCP candidate, referring to Gogo's ethnicity. The post was removed and Jean apologized, saying the post's "unacceptable connotation" was written by an unnamed volunteer.

Jean continued to criticize Kenney's leadership during the by-election campaign and accused Kenney of being too weak to defeat Rachel Notley in the 2023 Alberta general election. The UCP did not send any volunteers to help Jean with his campaign and Kenney criticized Jean for resigning from public office twice before.

Jean won the March 15, 2022 by-election after he openly campaigned in favour of removing Kenney from the leadership of the UCP.

Upon Kenney's announcement on May 18, 2022 that he would resign as premier, Jean declared his candidacy in the United Conservative party leadership election, which occurred on October 6, 2022.

Electoral record

Provincial

Federal 
Athabasca district (in Alberta)

References

External links 
 

1963 births
Bond University alumni
Conservative Party of Canada MPs
Lawyers in Alberta
Living people
Members of the House of Commons of Canada from Alberta
People from Fort McMurray
People from Kelowna
University of Calgary alumni
United Conservative Party MLAs
Warner Pacific University alumni
Wildrose Party MLAs
University of Calgary Faculty of Law alumni
21st-century Canadian politicians